The 1979–80 NCAA Division I men's basketball rankings was made up of two human polls, the AP Poll and the Coaches Poll, in addition to various other preseason polls.

Legend

AP Poll 
The final writers' poll was released on Tuesday, March 4.

UPI Poll 
The final coaches' poll was released on Tuesday, March 4.

References 

1979-80 NCAA Division I men's basketball rankings
College men's basketball rankings in the United States